The 2022 Australian Formula 3 Championship is an Australian open-wheel racing series for FIA Formula 3 cars constructed and conforming to the regulations before and including 2016, having previously been before and including 2011 the previous season. Organized by Formula Three Management Pty Ltd, it is to be the 22nd season of Australian Formula 3, with the 2020 and 2021 season having been cancelled due to the COVID-19 pandemic.

Teams and drivers
The following teams and drivers contested the 2022 Australian Formula 3 Championship. All teams are Australian-registered.

Classes
Competing cars were nominated into one of three classes:
 Championship Class – for automobiles constructed in accordance with the FIA Formula 3 regulations that applied in the year of manufacture between 1 January 2002 and 31 December 2016. It was announced that new for this season, all cars entered would qualify for Championship Class.
 National Class – for automobiles constructed in accordance with the FIA Formula 3 regulations that applied in the year of manufacture between 1 January 2002 and 31 December 2007.
 Invitation Category – for automobiles constructed in accordance with the FIA Formula 3 regulations that applied in the year of manufacture before 2002, as well as other open wheel ‘wings and slicks’ cars including Formula 1000, Formula Ford 2000, Formula Renault, Formula BMW, TRS, Formula 4, etc.

Championship standings 

 Points system
Points for are awarded as follows:

Drivers' championship

Notes

References

External links
 Official Web Page

Australian Formula 3 seasons
Formula 3
Australian
Australia